The following table lists Academy Awards held in museums and public collections:

References 

Trophies on public display